Than Swe may refer to:
Than Swe (diplomat), Minister of Foreign Affairs for Myanmar since 2023
Than Swe (historian), Deputy Minister of Culture for Myanmar from 2012 to 2015
Than Shwe, former military ruler of Myanmar.